This is a list of notable hotels in Mexico.

Hotels in Mexico

 Baja Club (La Paz)
 Be Tulum
 Hotel Terrestre (Oaxaca)
 Paradero Todos Santos
 Coqui Coqui Papholchac (Coba)
 Octavia Casa (Mexico City)
 Casa Silencio (Oaxaca City)
 La Valise San Miguel (San Miguel De Allende)
 Tulum Treehouse

See also
 List of companies of Mexico
 Lists of hotels – an index of hotel list articles on Wikipedia
 List of Mexican brands

References

External links
 

Hotels in Mexico
Mexico
Hotels